Lemyra punctilinea is a moth of the family Erebidae first described by Frederic Moore in 1879. It is found in Sichuan, Shaanxi, Yunnan, Pakistan, Kashmir, the Himalayas, Assam and Nepal.

References

Moths described in 1879
punctilinea